Foveolaria may refer to:
 Foveolaria (bryozoan), a genus of bryozoans in the family Foveolariidae
 Foveolaria, a genus of plants in the family Styracaceae, synonym of Styrax
 Foveolaria, a genus of plants in the family Elaeocarpaceae, synonym of Sloanea